Margaret Johnson may refer to:
Margaret Johnson (vocalist), American blues and jazz vocalist and pianist
Margaret Johnson (pianist) (1919–1939), American jazz pianist
Margaret Johnson (advertiser), executive creative director and partner at Goodby, Silverstein & Partners
Margaret Johnson Erwin Dudley (née Johnson, 1821–1863), Southern belle, planter and letter writer
Margaret Johnson (artist) (1898–1967), Sri-Lankan born Australian portrait artist
Margaret Johnson (athlete) (1937–2015), Australian athlete
Margaret Johnson (politician), Canadian politician in the Legislative Assembly of New Brunswick
Margaret Johnson (scientist), British physician
Maggie Pogue Johnson (1883–1956), Black American composer and poet
Margaret Delia Johnson (?–2016), chairwoman of West Sussex County Council, 2001-2008
Maggie Johnson, character in Central Intelligence
Maggie Johnson, wife of Clint Eastwood

See also
Peggy Johnson (disambiguation)
Margaret Johnston (1914–2002), Australian actress